The following is a list of works by Aulis Sallinen (b. 1935), presented as a sortable table with eight parameters per composition: title, category (orchestral, chamber, or unaccompanied choral), catalogue number, average duration (in minutes), year of composition, genre, and—if applicable—text author(s); for some compositions, comments are provided, as well. The table's default ordering is by genre and, within a genre, by date. To assist with navigation, the infobox provides page-jumps to the first entry for each group.

Oeuvre 
The compositional career of Finnish composer Aulis Sallinen has extended over six decades, from his first composition, Two Mythical Scenes for Orchestra  (Op. 1, 1956), to his most recent work, the Chamber Music X (Op. 114, 2018). Although Sallinen has composed across many genres—his oeuvre includes large-scale orchestral compositions, works for stage, chamber music, choral songs, pieces for instrumental soloist, etc.—his reputation rests primarily on his eight symphonies (1971–2001) and his seven operas (1973–2017).

Reflecting Sallinen's standing, each of the last four symphonies has resulted from an international commission: the Fifth, Washington Mosaics (Op. 57, 1985–87) for the National Symphony Orchestra (then under the direction of Mstislav Rostropovich); the Sixth, From a New Zealand Diary (Op. 65, 1990) for the New Zealand Symphony Orchestra; the Seventh, The Dreams of Gandalf (Op. 71, 1996) for the Gothenburg Symphony Orchestra; and, the Eighth, Autumnal Fragments (Op. 81, 2001) for the Royal Concertgebouw Orchestra.

When at work on an opera, Sallinen tends to compose simultaneously smaller "satellite" pieces, which share thematic material with their respective large-scale parents. Many of these compositions are substantial (rather than derivative) works, including: Four Dream Songs, Op. 30 (from The Horseman, Op. 32); Shadows, Op. 52 (from The King Goes Forth to France, Op. 53); The Palace Rhapsody, Op. 72 (from The Palace, Op. 68); and, A Solemn Overture, Op. 75 (from King Lear, Op. 76).

List of compositions

Notes, references, and sources

Notes

References

Sources 

CD liner notes

 
Sallinen, Aulis